Marylize Biubwa is a Kenyan intersectional feminist and activist. Biubwa's activism is based on social justice with emphasis on gender inequality, while her feminism is intersectional and directed towards human rights. She is black and a lesbian.

Early life 
Biubwa grew up in Nairobi and Taita Taveta. She was one of six children, with three sisters and two brothers. Her mother was religious and she was kicked out of her siblings' house when she came out to her family in August 2018. She has been diagnosed with social anxiety.

Social activism 
Biubwa became a full-time activist in 2015. She founded the Bi Kind Initiative in 2016, which mentors school-aged girls and organises drives to collect money and food for homeless women. She is a volunteer with ActionAid, the African Women's Development and Communication Network and Peace Ambassadors Kenya. She uses Twitter and other social media platforms to debunk myths about female sexuality and the LGBT community. She runs the research project Face on Project.

References 

21st-century Kenyan women
LGBT in Kenya
Living people
People from Nairobi
Year of birth missing (living people)